Relations are ways in which things, the relata, stand to each other. Relations are in many ways similar to properties in that both characterize the things they apply to. Properties are sometimes treated as a special case of relations involving only one relatum. In philosophy (especially metaphysics), theories of relations are typically introduced to account for repetitions of how several things stand to each other.

Overview
The concept of relation has a long and complicated history. One of the interests for the Greek philosophers lay in the number of ways in which a particular thing might be described, and the establishment of a relation between one thing and another was one of these. A second interest lay in the difference between these relations and the things themselves. This was to culminate in the view that the things in themselves could not be known except through their relations. Debates similar to these continue into modern philosophy and include further investigations into types of relation and whether relations exist only in the mind or the real world or both.

An understanding of types of relation is important to an understanding of relations between many things including those between people, communities and the wider world. Most of these are complex relations but of the simpler, analytical relations out of which they are formed there are sometimes held to be three types, although opinion on the number may differ. The three types are (1) spatial relations, which include geometry and number, (2) relations of cause and effect, and (3) the classificatory relations of similarity and difference that underlie knowledge. Similar classifications have been suggested in the sciences, mathematics, and the arts.

Internal and external relations
An important distinction is between internal and external relations. A relation is internal if it is fully determined by the features of its relata. For example, an apple and a tomato stand in the internal relation of similarity to each other because they are both red. Some philosophers have inferred from this that internal relations do not have a proper ontological status since they can be reduced to intrinsic properties. External relations, on the other hand, are not fixed by the features of their relata. For example, a book stands in an external relation to a table by lying on top of it. But this is not determined by the book's or the table's features like their color, their shape, etc. One problem associated with external relations is that they are difficult to locate. For example, the lying-on-top is located neither in the table nor in the apple. This has prompted some philosophers to deny that there are external relations. Properties do not face this problem since they are located in their bearer.

History

Ancient Greek philosophy
Traditionally the history of the concept of relation begins with Aristotle and his concept of relative terms. In Metaphysics he states: "Things are called relative as the double to the half... as that which can act to that which can be acted upon... and as the knowable to knowledge". It has been argued that the content of these three types can be traced back to the Eleatic Dilemmas, a series of puzzles through which the world can be explained in totally opposite ways, for example things can be both one and many, both moving and stationary and both like and unlike one another.

For Aristotle relation was one of ten distinct kinds of categories (Greek: kategoriai) which list the range of things that can be said about any particular subject: "...each signifies either substance or quantity or quality or relation or where or when or being-in-a-position or having or acting or being acted upon". Subjects and predicates were combined to form simple propositions. These were later redefined as "categorical" propositions in order to distinguish them from two other types of proposition, the disjunctive and the hypothetical, identified a little later by Chrysippus.

An alternative strand of thought at the time was that relation was more than just one of ten equal categories. A fundamental opposition was developing between substance and relation. Plato in Theaetetus had noted that "some say all things are said to be relative" and Speusippus, his nephew and successor at the Academy maintained the view that "... a thing cannot be known apart from the knowledge of other things, for to know what a thing is, we must know how it differs from other things".

Plotinus in third century Alexandria reduced Aristotle's categories to five: substance, relation, quantity, motion and quality. He gave further emphasis to the distinction between substance and relation and stated that there were grounds for the latter three: quantity, motion and quality to be considered as relations. Moreover, these latter three categories were posterior to the Eleatic categories, namely unity/plurality; motion/stability and identity/difference concepts that Plotinus called "the hearth of reality".

Plotinus liked to picture relations as lines linking elements, but in a process of abstraction our minds tend to ignore the lines "and think only of their terminals". His pupil and biographer, Porphyry, developed a tree analogy picturing the relations of knowledge as a tree branching from the highest genera down through intermediate species to the individuals themselves.

Scholasticism to the Enlightenment
The opposition between substance and relation was given a theological perspective in the Christian era. Basil in the Eastern church suggested that an understanding of the Trinity lay more in understanding the types of relation existing between the three members of the Godhead than in the nature of the Persons themselves. Thomas Aquinas in the Western church noted that in God "relations are real", and, echoing Aristotle, claimed that there were indeed three type of relation which give a natural order to the world. These were quantity, as in double and half; activity, as in acting and being acted upon; and understanding, through the qualitative concepts of genus and species. "Some have said that relation is not a reality but only an idea. But this is plainly seen to be false from the very fact that things themselves have a mutual natural order and relation... There are three conditions that make a relation to be real or logical ..."

The end of the Scholastic period marked the beginning of a decline in the pre-eminence of the classificatory relation as a way of explaining the world. Science was now in the ascendant and with it scientific reason and the relation of cause and effect. In Britain, John Locke, influenced by Isaac Newton and the laws of motion, developed a similar mechanistic view of the human mind. Following Hobbes's notion of "trains of thought" where one idea naturally follows another in the mind, Locke developed further the concept of knowledge as the perception of relations between ideas. These relations included mathematical relations, scientific relations such as co-existence and succession, and the relations of identity and difference.

It was left to the Scottish philosopher David Hume to reduce these kinds of mental association to three: "To me there appears to be only three principles of connexion among ideas namely Resemblance, Contiguity in time or place, and Cause or Effect".

The problem which troubled Hume of being able to establish the reality of relations from experience, in particular the relation of cause and effect, was solved in another way by Immanuel Kant who took the view that our knowledge is only partly derived from the external world. Part of our knowledge he argued must be due to the modifying nature of our own minds which imposes on perception not only the forms of space and time but also the categories of relation which he understood to be a priori concepts contained within the understanding. Of these he famously said: "Everything in our knowledge... contains nothing but mere relations".

Kant took a more analytical view of the concept of relation and his categories of relation were three namely, community, causality and inherence. These can be compared with Hume's three kinds of association in that, firstly, community depicts elements conjoined in time and space, secondly causality compares directly with cause and effect, and thirdly inherence implies the relation of a quality to its subject and plays an essential part in any consideration of the concept of resemblance. Preceding the table of categories in the Critique of Pure Reason is the table of judgements and here, under the heading of relation, are the three types of syllogism namely the disjunctive, the hypothetical and the categorical, developed as we have seen through Aristotle, Chryssipus and the logicians of the Middle Ages. Schopenhauer raised objections to the term Community and the term disjunction, as a relation, can be usefully substituted for the more complex concept of community. G.W.F. Hegel also referred to three types of proposition but in Hegel the categories of relation which for Kant were "subjective mental processes" have now become "objective ontological entities".

Late modern and contemporary philosophy
Late modern American philosopher C. S. Peirce recorded that his own categories of relation grew originally out of a study of Kant. He introduced three metaphysical categories which pervaded his philosophy, and these were ordered through a consideration of the development of our mental processes:

 Firstness: "The first is predominant in feeling... the whole content of consciousness is made up of qualities of feeling as truly as the whole of space is made up of points or the whole of time by instants".  Consciousness in a sense arises through the gradual disjunction of what was once whole. Elements appear to be monadic in character and are represented as points in space and time.
 Secondness: The idea of secondness "is predominant in the ideas of causation" coming into being as "an action and reaction" between ourselves and some other, or between ourselves and a stimulus.  It is essentially dyadic in character and in some versions of symbolic logic is represented by an arrow.
 Thirdness: "Ideas in which thirdness predominates include the idea of a sign or representation... For example, a picture signifies by similarity". This type of relation is essentially triadic in nature and is represented in Peirce's logic as a brace or bracket.

These categories of relation appeared in Peirce's logic of relatives and followed earlier work undertaken by the mathematician Augustus De Morgan at Cambridge who had introduced the notion of relation into formal logic in 1849. Among the philosophers who followed may be mentioned T. H. Green in England who took the view that all reality lies in relations and William James in America who, emphasising the concept of relation, pictured the world as a "concatenated unity" with some parts joined and other parts disjoined.

Contemporary British philosopher Bertrand Russell, in 1921, reinforced James's view that "... the raw material out of which the world is built up, is not of two sorts, one matter and one mind but that it is designed in different patterns by its interrelations, and that some arrangements may be called mental, while others may be called physical". Wittgenstein, also in 1921, saw the same kinds of relation structuring both the material world and the mental world. While the real world consisted of objects and their relations which combined to form facts, the mental world consisted of similar subjects and predicates which pictured or described the real world. For Wittgenstein there were three kinds of description (enumeration, function and law) which themselves bear a notable if distant "family resemblance" to the three kinds of relation whose history we have been following.

Also of note at the beginning of the twentieth century were arguments associated with G. E. Moore among others concerning the concept of internal and external relations whereby relations could be seen as either contingent or accidental parts of the definition of a thing.

See also
Object (philosophy)
Property (philosophy)

In mathematics
Finitary relation
Binary relation
Function (mathematics)
Mapping (mathematics)
Morphism
Homomorphism
Transformation (mathematics)

References

Further reading
 G. E. Moore (December 15, 1919), "External and Internal Relations", Proceedings of the Aristotelian Society 20 (1919–20): 40–62.

External links
 
 

Concepts in metaphysics